Jalan Kuala Gula (Perak state route A197) is a major road in Perak, Malaysia.

List of junctions

Kuala Gula